Vanaja Girija is a 1994 Tamil-language comedy film directed by Keyaar. The film stars Ramki, Napoleon, Khushbu, and Mohini. It was released on 16 December 1994. The film is a remake of Engamma Sapatham (1974) written by the same writer and it was remade in Telugu as Mama Bagunnava (1997) with Mohini reprising her role.

Plot
The veterinarian Anand and the doctor Raja are brothers. Their father Ramanathan is a rich retired businessman. Vanaja and Girija live with their mother Lakshmi. Their father Shankar has left them when they were young because of Ramanathan. Vanaja and Girija decide to take revenge on Ramanathan by charming his sons.

Cast

Ramki as Raja
Napoleon as Anand
Khushbu as Vanaja
Mohini as Girija
Visu as Ramanathan
Urvashi as Chellamma
Vivek as Appu
Senthil as Kuppuswamy
Nizhalgal Ravi as Shankar
Kavitha as Lakshmi 
Vadivukkarasi as Vadivu
Thyagu as Thyagu
Mahanadi Shankar as Selvam
K. S. Jayalakshmi as Mary
Kumarimuthu

Casting

The main female lead cast was offered initially to Meena and Roja, but both only wanted the role of the younger sister. Khushbu was signed to play the elder sister and Meena the younger sister. But Meena did not want to be cast opposite Ramki, as she only paired with top leading actors. Mohini was signed for the younger sister role. She was recommended by Keyaar, who had introduced her to the film industry.

Soundtrack
The music was composed by Ilaiyaraaja (in his 700th film composition), with lyrics written by Vaali and Panchu Arunachalam.

Reception 
K. Vijiyan of New Straits Times gave a positive review that the film reminded him of Magalir Mattum and that the director "has managed to exploit most of the scenes in the movie for maximum comic relief".

References

External links

1990s Tamil-language films
1994 comedy-drama films
1994 films
Films about siblings
Films directed by Keyaar
Films scored by Ilaiyaraaja
Films with screenplays by Panchu Arunachalam
Indian comedy-drama films
Tamil films remade in other languages